Icecon is a science fiction, fantasy, horror and comic fan convention in Reykjavík, Iceland. The first Icecon was held in 2016. Icecon is a biannual con for both Icelandic and international science fiction and fantasy fandom, and is the only literary Icelandic science fiction and fantasy convention.

List of Icecons

Gallery

References

External links 
Icecon's home page

Science fiction conventions in Europe
Cultural festivals in Iceland